Maleniec  is a village in the administrative district of Gmina Ruda Maleniecka, within Końskie County, Świętokrzyskie Voivodeship, in south-central Poland.

The village has a population of 150.

Notable people
Yisrael Kristal (1903–2017), Polish-Israeli supercentenarian, former oldest living man in the world and former oldest Holocaust survivor

References

Villages in Końskie County